Norbert Szabián (born 24 September 1982) is a Hungarian Olympic shooter. He represented his country at the 2016 Summer Olympics.

References 

1982 births
Living people
Hungarian male sport shooters
Shooters at the 2016 Summer Olympics
Olympic shooters of Hungary